Adaklı is a village in the Yüksekova District of Hakkâri Province in Turkey. The village is populated by Kurds of the Doski, Oramar and Pinyanişî tribes and had a population of 11,05 in 2022. The village was previously Nestorian.

History 
The village of Adaklı was previously Nestorian until Sayfo and was bought from the central government by Kurds from different tribal backgrounds creating a mixed tribally-composed village.

Population 
Population history of the village from 2000 to 2022:

References 

Villages in Yüksekova District
Kurdish settlements in Hakkâri Province
Historic Assyrian communities in Turkey